Deta is a town in Timiș County, Romania. It administers a single village, Opatița.

Geography 
Deta is located in the low plain of Bârzava and is crossed by the Birdanca, a tributary of Bârzava which during flood periods acts as a valve of Bârzava. It borders Voiteg to the north, Birda to the northeast and east, Denta to the south and Banloc to the west.

The territory of the locality is dominated by the temperate continental climate. As a share, the largest influence is the maritime air masses from the west, with a high degree of humidity, then the subtropical ones from the Mediterranean and the continental ones from the east. Due to these climatic characteristics, winters are not very cold, summers are hot, and springs and autumns are quite short. The average annual temperature is between 10–11 °C, while the maximum reaches 40 °C.

The predominant form of relief is the plain, favorable to agriculture. The grassy and forest-steppe vegetation predominates around the town. The woody vegetation is characteristic of lowland areas. The fauna is predominated by rodents; there are also hares, deer, fallow deer, wild boars, foxes and squirrels. Among the birds found here are pheasants, northern goshawks, skylarks, little owls, tits, nightingales, starlings, wild ducks and wild geese.

History 

Based on the archaeological evidence, the existence of this settlement has been established since the Neolithic, later evolving in the other historical eras (Bronze Age, Iron Age, Daco-Roman period and migration period). During the Roman period, the Roman castrum Potula existed here. The first recorded mention of Deta takes place in 1360, under the name of Ded, being the possession of nobleman Johannes de Deed, from which derives the current name. In 1411 and 1427, the locality is recorded with the names Ded and Kyzded ("Little Ded"), respectively. During the Ottoman domination, it declines. In his travel journals from 1660–1664, Turkish traveler Evliya Çelebi, who was visiting Banat, states that Deta was inhabited by Romanians.

From 1724, when the colonization of Banat by the Germans from Bavaria and Alsace/Lorraine began, the locality was reborn, its name being transformed into Detta, after the old name Ded. In the same year, the first Roman Catholic church was built and the official registration of baptisms, deaths and marriages began (1725). Colonization began in 1737 and lasted until 1794, and in addition to the Germans, 21 Italian families from Milan area were colonized in 1763. The first colony consisted of a few houses on the present-day main street today and up to the old Bellavista Hotel. At that time, the Birda stream was the border of the settlement. At first the life of the colony was extremely harsh: the plague epidemic of 1738 quickly decimated the population. Until 1751 the locality was under military administration and developed less. It was only after it came under civilian administration, initially subordinated to Denta, that it was able to develop. The state organized colonization at its own expense.

As the climate was very favorable for the rice plant, the state brought in specialized Italian settlers who re-established rice fields here (a few decades ago, Count Mercy had already tried to develop this crop, but due to epidemics they had been abandoned). From that period, the Italian Arizi and Timary families became famous, with special merits in rice cultivation. At the same time, the growth of silkworms was stimulated, an activity that the locals practiced with skill.

In 1810, Deta is elevated to the rank of market town, until the end of the 19th century, by Emperor Francis I of Austria, due to the development it experiences in agriculture, trade, animal husbandry and craftsmanship. The opening of the Timișoara–Baziaș railway, which passed through Deta, in 1858, created favorable conditions for trade in grain and animals.

In 1867, after the incorporation of Banat into Hungary, Plasa Deta was established, with 13 communes, which belonged to Temes County. At the same time, it is recognized as an important economic center. It experiences a significant urban development; schools and institutions are built, sewerage works are carried out, sidewalks are put in and the telephone is introduced (1899). The Bellavista Hotel was built in the 19th century, a meeting place for Romanian and Serbian townspeople in the area. In 1902, the power plant was built and electric lighting was introduced. 

In Ghidul Banatului, edited by Emil Grădinariu and Ion Stoia-Udrea in 1936, Deta was described as follows:

It experienced a period of crisis again and fell from the status of town, becoming one of the rural localities. After World War II, Deta experienced a new stage in its development, this time marked by communist ideology and organization. In 1968 it received the status of town (for the third time in its history). New blocks of flats are being built, new public institutions are being brought in, etc.

Demographics 

Deta had a population of 6,260 inhabitants at the 2011 census, down 3% from the 2002 census. Most inhabitants are Romanians (67.84%), larger minorities being represented by Hungarians (13.88%), Germans (4.03%), Serbs (3.96%), Roma (2.3%) and Bulgarians (1.93%). For 5.37% of the population, ethnicity is unknown. By religion, most inhabitants are Orthodox (61.05%), but there are also minorities of Roman Catholics (26.15%), Serbian Orthodox (2.83%) and Pentecostals (2.16%). For 5.62% of the population, religious affiliation is unknown.

Economy 
Industry is the most important economic branch. Traditionally, wood processing factories (plywood and veneers) and clay mining industry have developed here. After the 1989 revolution, development was severely hampered, so that after 2000 Deta could start a development process again. A number of foreign investors have opened numerous factories here that have polarized economic activity and human resources in the town and the area of influence. It has over 1,900 employees, of which 1,100 from Deta, the rest being captured from the surrounding localities. Other companies are present in the fields of wood processing, food industry and textiles.

Twin towns 
Deta is twinned with:
  Bordány
  Čoka
  Gaglianico

References 

Towns in Romania
Populated places in Timiș County
Localities in Romanian Banat